Nørdre Svarthaugen or Nordre Svarthaugen is a mountain in Skjåk Municipality in Innlandet county, Norway. The mountain is surrounded by several other notable mountains including Løyfthøene and Buakollen to the northeast, Skarvedalseggen to the north, and Stamåhjulet to the northwest.

See also
List of mountains of Norway

References

Skjåk
Mountains of Innlandet